An import license is a document issued by a  national government authorizing the importation of certain goods into its territory. Import licenses are considered to be non-tariff barriers to trade when used as a way to discriminate against another country's goods in order to protect a domestic industry from foreign competition.

Each license specifies the volume of imports allowed, and the total volume allowed should not exceed the quota. Licenses can be sold to importing companies at a competitive price, or simply a set fee. However, it is argued that this allocation method provides incentives for political lobbying and bribery. Governments may put certain restrictions on what is imported as well as the amount of imported goods and services. For example, if a business wishes to import agricultural products such as vegetables, then the government may be concerned about the impact of such importations of the local market and thus impose a restriction.

Système Intégré de Gestion de Licenses
The Système Intégré de Gestion de Licenses (SIGL) is the European Union Directorate General for Trade's integrated IT system for the management of licences for imports of textiles, clothing, footwear, steel and wood to the EU.

See also
Importation right

References

External links
 WTO: Trade Topics - Import Licensing Gateway

Non-tariff barriers to trade
Import